Coleophora teneriffella is a moth of the family Coleophoridae. It is found on the Canary Islands.

References

teneriffella
Moths of Africa
Moths described in 1987